In academic publishing, an eprint or e-print is a digital version of a research document (usually a journal article, but could also be a thesis, conference paper, book chapter, or a book) that is accessible online, usually as green open access, whether from a local institutional or 
a central digital repository.

When applied to journal articles, the term "eprints" covers both preprints (before peer review) and postprints (after peer review).

Digital versions of materials other than research documents are not usually called e-prints, but some other name, such as e-books.

See also
 Electronic article
 Electronic journal
 Electronic publishing
 Open access

References

External links
 What is an eprint? as defined in the FAQ section of eprints.org
 Eprints as defined by Stevan Harnad

Open access (publishing)
Communication
Academic publishing
Research
Archival science
Electronic publishing